The 2003–04 Moldovan Cup was the 13th season of the Moldovan annual football cup competition. The competition ended with the final held on 30 May 2004.

Round of 16
The first legs were played on 1 October 2003. The second legs were played on 22 October 2003.

|}

Quarter-finals
The first legs were played on 5 November 2003. The second legs were played on 13 November 2003.

|}

Semi-finals
The first legs were played on 4 April 2004. The second legs were played on 14 April 2004.

|}

Final

References
 

Moldovan Cup seasons
Moldovan Cup
Moldova